Maoritomella foliacea is a species of sea snail, a marine gastropod mollusk in the family Borsoniidae.

Description
The height of the shell attains 4.8 mm, its width 2.2 mm.

Distribution
This marine species is endemic to Australia and occurs on the continental shelf of New South Wales

References

 Laseron, C. 1954. Revision of the New South Wales Turridae (Mollusca). Australian Zoological Handbook. Sydney : Royal Zoological Society of New South Wales 1–56, pls 1–12.

External links
 
  Bouchet P., Kantor Yu.I., Sysoev A. & Puillandre N. (2011) A new operational classification of the Conoidea. Journal of Molluscan Studies 77: 273–308

foliacea
Gastropods of Australia
Gastropods described in 1954